Studio 7 is a Philippine television variety show broadcast by GMA Network. Directed by Miguel Tanchanco, it is hosted by Christian Bautista, Julie Anne San Jose and Mark Bautista. It premiered on October 14, 2018 on the network's Sabado Star Power sa Gabi line-up replacing The Clash and Kapuso Movie Night. The show concluded on December 7, 2019 with a total of 59 episodes. It was replaced by Kapuso Movie Night in its timeslot.

Cast

Hosts
 Christian Bautista (2018–2019)
 Mark Bautista (2018–2019)
 Julie Anne San Jose (2018–2019)

Co-hosts / performers
 Migo Adecer (2018–2019)
 Josh Adornado (2018–2019)
 Kyline Alcantara (2018–2019)
 Garrett Bolden (2018–2019)
 Golden Cañedo (2018–2019)
 Angel Guardian (2019)
 Ken Chan (2019)
 Paolo Contis (2019)
 Rayver Cruz (2018–2019)
 Rodjun Cruz (2018–2019)
 Rita Daniela (2019)
 Gabbi Garcia (2018–2019)
 Maricris Garcia (2018–2019)
 JBK (2018–2019)
 Cassy Legaspi (2018–2019)
 Mavy Legaspi (2018–2019)
 Jong Madaliday (2018–2019)
 Mirriam Manalo (2018–2019)
 Donita Nose (2018–2019)
 Mikee Quintos (2018–2019)
 Anthony Rosaldo (2018–2019)
 Paul Salas (2018–2019)
 Aicelle Santos (2018–2019)
 Kate Valdez (2018–2019)
 Joaquin Domagoso (2019)

Ratings
According to AGB Nielsen Philippines' Nationwide Urban Television Audience Measurement People in Television Homes, the pilot episode of Studio 7 earned a 12.2% rating. While based from Nationwide Urban Television People audience shares, the series had its highest rating on October 14, 2018 with a 12.3 rating

Accolades

References

External links
 
 

2018 Philippine television series debuts
2019 Philippine television series endings
Filipino-language television shows
GMA Network original programming
Philippine variety television shows